ECA Records is a record label based in New York City. Its most notable artists are The Number 12 Looks Like You and its alumni artist Senses Fail, of whom they released the debut EP.

Artists 
This list was compiled based on the label's website and other sources.

Active artists 
 Christians & Lions
 Ramona Cordova
 Denver in Dallas
 Kay Kay and His Weathered Underground
 The Lido Venice
 The Number 12 Looks Like You
 Tunnel of Love
 Weatherbox
 Zulu Pearls
 Jason Anderson
 Dave Conway
 Pascalle
 The Prize Fight

Alumni 
 Senses Fail
 There for Tomorrow
 Weatherbox

See also 
 List of record labels

External links

References 

American record labels